Kamatagi  is a town in the northern state of Karnataka, India. It is located in the Hungund taluk of Bagalkot district in Karnataka.

Demographics
 India census, Kamatagi had a population of 14,380 with 7,261 males and 7,119 females.

 Bagalkot
 https://web.archive.org/web/20150103152428/http://ravichandragroup.in/
 Districts of Karnataka

References

Villages in Bagalkot district